This Is It: The Very Best Of is a compilation album by Australian singer Dannii Minogue released in 2013. Besides including singles from her five studio albums, the album boasts a cover of "The Winner Takes It All", recorded as a duet with Kylie Minogue in 2008 for the British sitcom Beautiful People soundtrack and "'Cos You're Beautiful", a new track Dannii recorded in 2010 with her X Factor protegee Ruth Lorenzo. The album noticeably includes the mashup remix of "Don't Wanna Lose This Feeling" with Madonna's 1985 single "Into the Groove" rather than its main single version.

The album was released to celebrate Minogue's debut on the Australian version of X Factor.

Track listing
The Australian CD release features 21 tracks while the digital release features three extra singles, adding up to a total of 24 songs.

In the UK, the album was issued by All Around the World and features a previously unreleased mix of "Love's on Every Corner" as a further additional song, adding up to the total of 25 tracks.

Charts

Release history

Notes

2013 greatest hits albums
Dannii Minogue compilation albums